The term "information algebra" refers to mathematical techniques of information processing. Classical information theory goes back to Claude Shannon. It is a theory of information transmission, looking at communication and storage. However, it has not been considered so far that information comes from different sources and that it is therefore usually combined. It has furthermore been neglected in classical information theory that one wants to extract those parts out of a piece of information that are relevant to specific questions.

A mathematical phrasing of these operations leads to an algebra of information, describing basic modes of information processing. Such an algebra involves several formalisms of computer science, which seem to be different on the surface: relational databases, multiple systems of formal logic or numerical problems of linear algebra. It allows the development of generic procedures of information processing and thus a unification of basic methods of computer science, in particular of distributed information processing.

Information relates to precise questions, comes from different sources, must be aggregated, and can be focused on questions of interest. Starting from these considerations, information algebras  are two-sorted algebras , where  is a semigroup, representing combination or aggregation of information,  is a lattice of domains (related to questions) whose partial order reflects the granularity of the domain or the question, and a mixed operation representing focusing or extraction of information.

Information and its operations 
More precisely, in the two-sorted algebra , the following operations are defined

Additionally, in  the usual lattice operations (meet and join) are defined.

Axioms and definition 
The axioms of the two-sorted algebra , in addition to the axioms of the lattice :

A two-sorted algebra  satisfying these axioms is called an Information Algebra.

Order of information 
A partial order of information can be introduced by defining  if . The semigroup  is a semilattice relative to this order, i.e. . Relative to any domain (question)  a partial order can be introduced by defining   if .

Labeled information algebra 
The pairs , where  and  such that  form a labeled Information Algebra. More precisely, in the two-sorted algebra , the following operations are defined

Models of information algebras 
Here follows an incomplete list of instances of information algebras:
Relational algebra: The reduct of a relational algebra with natural join as combination and the usual projection is a labeled information algebra, see Example.
Constraint systems: Constraints form an information algebra .
Semiring valued algebras: C-Semirings induce information algebras ;;. 
Logic: Many logic systems induce information algebras . Reducts of cylindric algebras  or polyadic algebras are information algebras related to predicate logic .
Module algebras: ;.
Linear systems: Systems of linear equations or linear inequalities induce information algebras .

Worked-out example: relational algebra 

Let  be a set of symbols, called attributes (or column names). For each  let  be a non-empty set, the set of all possible values of the attribute . For example, if 
, then  could

Let . An -tuple is a function  so that
For an -tuple  and a subset
 the restriction  is defined to be the
-tuple  so that  for all .

. For  the projection of  onto  is defined
as follows:

defined as follows:

As an example, let  and  be the following relations:

A relational database with natural join  as combination and the usual projection  is an information algebra.
The operations are well defined since
 
 If , then .
It is easy to see that relational databases satisfy the axioms of a labeled
information algebra:
 semigroup   and 
 transitivity  If , then .
 idempotency  If , then .
 support  If , then .

Connections 

 Valuation algebras  Dropping the idempotency axiom leads to valuation algebras. For a book-length exposition on the topic see .
 Domains and information systems Compact Information Algebras  are related to Scott domains and Scott information systems  ;;.
 Uncertain information  Random variables with values in information algebras represent probabilistic argumentation systems .
 Semantic information  Information algebras introduce semantics by relating information to questions through focusing and combination ;.
 Information flow  Information algebras are related to information flow, in particular classifications  .
 Tree decomposition  ...
 Semigroup theory  ...
 Compositional models Such models may be defined within the framework of information algebras: https://arxiv.org/abs/1612.02587
 Extended axiomatic foundations of information and valuation algebras The concept of conditional independence is basic for information algebras and a new axiomatic foundation of information algebras, based on conditional independence, extending the old one (see above) is available: https://arxiv.org/abs/1701.02658

Historical Roots 
The axioms for information algebras are derived from 
the axiom system proposed in (Shenoy and Shafer, 1990), see also (Shafer, 1991).

References 
 
 
 
 
 
  
 
 
  
 
  
 
  
  
 
  
 
  
  
  
 
 

Information theory
Abstract algebra